HMS Foyle was a Laird-type River-class destroyer ordered by the Royal Navy under the 1902–1903 Naval Estimates. Named after the River Foyle in Ireland, she was the first ship to carry this name in the Royal Navy.

Construction
She was laid down on 12 June 1902 at the Cammell Laird shipyard at Birkenhead and launched on 25 February 1903.  She was completed in March 1903.  Her original armament was to be the same as the Turtleback torpedo boat destroyers that preceded her. In 1906 the Admiralty decided to upgrade the armament by landing the five 6-pounder naval guns and shipping three 12-pounder 8 hundredweight (cwt) guns. Two would be mounted abeam at the foc's'le break and the third gun would be mounted on the quarterdeck.

Service history
After commissioning she was assigned to the East Coast Destroyer Flotilla of the 1st Fleet and based at Harwich. On 27 April 1908 the Eastern Flotilla departed Harwich for live fire and night manoeuvres. During these exercises  rammed and sank  then damaged .

In April 1909 she was assigned to the 3rd Destroyer Flotilla of the 1st Fleet on its formation at Harwich. She remained until displaced by a Basilisk-class destroyer by May 1912. She went into reserve in the 5th Destroyer Flotilla of the 2nd Fleet with a nucleus crew.

On 30 August 1912 the Admiralty directed all destroyer classes were to be designated by alpha characters starting with the letter 'A'. The ships of the River class were assigned to the E class. After 30 September 1913, she was known as an E-class destroyer and had the letter 'E' painted on the hull below the bridge area and on either the fore or aft funnel.

World War I
The 9th Flotilla was a patrol flotilla tasked with anti-submarine and counter mining patrols in the Firth of Forth area. By September 1914, she was deployed to Portsmouth and the Dover Patrol. Here she provided anti-submarine, counter mining patrols and defended the Dover Barrage.

In August 1915 with the amalgamation of the 7th and 9th Flotillas, she was assigned to the 1st Destroyer Flotilla when it was redeployed to Portsmouth in November 1916. She was equipped with depth charges for employment in anti-submarine patrols, escorting of merchant ships and defending the Dover Barrage. In spring 1917 as the convoy system was being introduced the 1st Flotilla was employed in convoy escort duties for the English Channel for the remainder of the war.

Loss
Her bow was blown off and she foundered while under tow to Plymouth.

Wreck site
Her wreck is located at position .

Pennant numbers

References

Bibliography
 
 
 
 
 
 
 

 

River-class destroyers
1903 ships